Photoreceptor can refer to:

In anatomy/cell biology:
Photoreceptor cell, a photosensitive cell in the retina of vertebrate eyes
Simple eye in invertebrates (Ocellus), photoreceptor organ ("simple eye") of invertebrates often composed of a few sensory cells and a single lens
Eyespot apparatus (microbial photoreceptor), the photoreceptor organelle of a unicellular organism that allows for phototaxis

In biochemistry:
Photoreceptor protein, a chromoprotein that responds to being exposed to a certain wavelength of light by initiating a signal transduction cascade
Photopigment, an unstable pigment that undergoes a physical or chemical change upon absorbing a particular wavelength of light; also see
Photosynthetic pigment, molecules involved in transducing light into chemical energy

In technology:
Photodetector or photosensor, a device that detects light by capturing photons

See also
 Eye (disambiguation)